Klínovec is the highest peak of the Ore Mountains, located in the Czech Republic's part of the mountains at . There is an 80 m TV broadcasting tower on the top of the mountain and a 24 meter high lookout tower. From the south side, the Jáchymov - Klínovec chairlift leads to the top (length 2,168 m and elevation 480 m), from the north side leads another chairlift Dámská (length 1,210 m and elevation 232 m).

Location 
Klínovec lies in northern Bohemia, on the border between the Karlovy Vary and Ústí nad Labem regions. Access to the peak is provided by a road from Boží Dar, tourist trails (marked red and yellow), or a chairlift from Jáchymov, running all year round. These days, Klínovec is a popular regional ski resort, featuring more than 10 km (6 miles) of ski pistes, 35 km (20 miles) of trails for cross-country skiing and a snowpark.

Climate

History

Thanks to its elevation, Klínovec offers marvellous panoramic view of Bohemia and Saxony. On a clear day, the Upper Palatine Forest may be seen to the south, 150 kilometres (90 miles) away, or the Ještěd mountain to the east.

The first public observation tower was built on the summit as early as 1817, and instantly became popular among visitors of the famous spa of Karlovy Vary. However, the wooden tower burnt down in 1868, and a new stone one was built between the years 1883 and 1884. This tower bore the name Kaiser-Franz-Josephs-Turm ("Emperor Franz Joseph Tower") and has survived until the present.

The tower is 24 metres (79') high and was extended with a hotel in 1893, when its popularity grew to such an extent, that accommodation was needed. The complex has been further extended over time, but it is currently in poor condition. Attempts to restore the buildings have been delayed through a lack of funds, although work was due to start in 2012.

In addition, a 56 metre (183') high broadcasting tower was erected on the top of Klínovec in the 1950s, exceeding the height of the observation tower by 32 metres (105'). The Klínovec TV tower covers most of the Karlovy Vary and Ústí nad Labem regions and broadcasts in digital.

Gallery

See also
 List of mountains in the Ore Mountains

References

External links
 Panoramic overview of the area
 The "Top ten" of the Karlovy Vary Region

Mountains and hills of the Czech Republic
Mountains of the Ore Mountains
Ski areas and resorts in the Czech Republic
Karlovy Vary District
Chomutov District